Sophia Eleonore of Saxony (23 November 1609 – 2 June 1671) was a duchess of Saxony by birth and the landgravine of Hesse-Darmstadt from 1627 to 1661 through her marriage to Landgrave George II. She was the eldest surviving child of John George I, Elector of Saxony, and Magdalene Sibylle of Prussia.

Life
She was born in Dresden. Her two sisters were Marie Elisabeth and Magdalene Sibylle. Her brothers were Johann Georg, August, Christian, and Maurice.

She married Landgrave Georg II of Hesse-Darmstadt on 1 April 1627 in Torgau, aged seventeen. In the middle of Thirty Years' War their marriage was lavishly celebrated with the first opera in German language Dafne. They had fifteen children; she raised them as strict Lutherans. However, her daughter Elisabeth Amalie, later Electress Palatine, converted to Roman Catholicism in 1653.

Sophie Eleonore showed huge interest in antiquarian books which she collected. Her contribution to the Hesse-Darmstadt court library is still visible today. She survived her husband by ten years and died in Darmstadt.

Children
She had the following children with George II, Landgrave of Hesse-Darmstadt:
 Louis VI, Landgrave of Hesse-Darmstadt (1630–1678)
 George, married Dorothea Augusta, Duchess of Holstein-Sonderborg; died in 1676 in Vöhl
 John
 Magdalene Sibylle
 Sophia Eleonore, married William Christoph, Landgrave of Hessen-Homburg
 Elisabeth Amalie, married Philipp Wilhelm, Elector Palatine
 Louise Christine (1636–1697), married Christoph Louis, Count of Stolberg-Stolberg
 Anna Maria
 Anna Sophia, Princess-Abbess of Quedlinburg
 Amalia Juliana
 Stillborn daughter
 Henrike Dorothea, married Count John II of Waldeck-Landau
 Augusta Philippina
 Agnes
 Marie Hedwig (1647–1680), married Bernhard I, Duke of Saxe-Meiningen

Ancestry

References

|-
 

  

1609 births
1671 deaths
Landgravines of Hesse-Darmstadt
German Lutherans
Sophia Eleonore
Nobility from Dresden
Albertine branch
Daughters of monarchs